6 Guns is a 2010 American Western direct-to-video film distributed by The Asylum and directed by Shane Van Dyke.

Premise 
To exact revenge on the men who killed her family and raped her, Selina Stevens (Sage Mears) enlists the aid of Frank Allison (Barry Van Dyke), a bounty hunter, in teaching her the art of gunfighting.

Cast
 Barry Van Dyke as Frank Allison
 Sage Mears as Selina Stevens
 Greg Evigan as Sheriff Barr
 Brian Wimmer as Will Stevens
 Geoff Meed as Lee Horn
 Shane Van Dyke as Chris Beall
 Carey Van Dyke as Joe Beall
 Jason Ellefson as Tommy Kleiber
 Jonathan Nation as Henry
 Erin Marie Hogan as Scarlet
 Tom "snake dancer" Troutman as Snake Dancer

References

External links 
 6 Guns at The Asylum
 
 

2010 films
2010 direct-to-video films
2010 Western (genre) films
American direct-to-video films
Direct-to-video Western (genre) films
2010 independent films
2010s English-language films
Films directed by Shane Van Dyke
The Asylum films
2010s American films